Samakele is a small town and seat of the commune of Ben Kadi in the Cercle of Banamba in the Koulikoro Region of south-western Mali.

References

Populated places in Koulikoro Region